Federico Axel Gay (born 7 December 1991) is an Argentine professional footballer who plays as a defender for Comunicaciones.

Career
Gay's career began with Independiente. He didn't appear in the Primera División, though was an unused substitute on four occasions. He made a sole appearance for them in the Copa Argentina on 12 June 2013, coming off the bench at the interval of a 1–0 defeat; though his bow lasted just thirty-four minutes after he received a red card on eighty minutes. Across the following eighteen months, Gay made loan moves to Aldosivi and Chacarita Juniors, where he won promotion. A total of fourteen matches came in Primera B Nacional and Primera B Metropolitana. A third loan was sealed in 2015 to Sportivo Italiano.

January 2016 saw Gay join Fénix. However, like with Sportivo Italiano, the defender didn't feature in Primera B Metropolitana. Comunicaciones signed Gay on 21 August 2016. He participated twenty-one times in two seasons with the club, including for his debut on 5 November 2016 in a goalless draw away to Almirante Brown.

Career statistics
.

References

External links

1991 births
Living people
Sportspeople from Avellaneda
Argentine footballers
Association football defenders
Primera Nacional players
Primera B Metropolitana players
Club Atlético Independiente footballers
Aldosivi footballers
Chacarita Juniors footballers
Sportivo Italiano footballers
Club Atlético Fénix players
Club Comunicaciones footballers